Yakuhananomia yakui is a species of beetle in the family Mordellidae. It was described in 1930. It is found in Japan.

References

Mordellidae
Beetles of Asia
Insects of Japan
Endemic fauna of Japan
Beetles described in 1930